Prabhu Dayal Katheria (born 22 August 1952) is an Indian politician and agriculturist. He was former member of parliament from Firozabad.

References

Lok Sabha members from Uttar Pradesh
People from Firozabad district
1952 births
Living people
India MPs 1991–1996
India MPs 1996–1997
India MPs 1998–1999
Bharatiya Janata Party politicians from Uttar Pradesh